Mbaye Diop (born July 24, 1984) is a Senegalese retired footballer.

References

External links
 

1984 births
Living people
Senegalese footballers
S.C. Dragões Sandinenses players
A.D. Camacha players
PFC Slavia Sofia players
G.D. Chaves players
C.F. União players
G.D. Interclube players
S.C. Farense players
First Professional Football League (Bulgaria) players
Expatriate footballers in Portugal
Expatriate footballers in Bulgaria
Expatriate footballers in Angola
Senegalese expatriate sportspeople in Portugal
Senegalese expatriate sportspeople in Bulgaria
Senegalese expatriate sportspeople in Angola
Association football forwards